Mason Headley (pronounced may-son hed-lee) is a neighborhood in southwestern Lexington, Kentucky, United States. Its boundaries are Mason Headley Road to the north, Laurel Hill Road to the south, Beacon Hill Drive to the west, and Cold Harbor Drive to the east.

Neighborhood statistics
 Area: 
 Population: 323
 Population density: 3,369 people per square mile
 Median household income: $52,008

External links
 http://www.city-data.com/neighborhood/Mason-Headley-Lexington-KY.html

Neighborhoods in Lexington, Kentucky